The 1980–81 San Francisco Dons men's basketball team represented the University of San Francisco as a member of the West Coast Athletic Conference during the 1980–81 NCAA Division I men's basketball season. The Dons finished the season with a 24–7 record (11–3 WCAC) and received a bid to the NCAA Tournament as No. 9 seed in the West region.

Roster

Schedule and results

|-
!colspan=9 style=| Regular season

|-
!colspan=9 style=| NCAA Tournament

Rankings

Awards and honors
Quintin Dailey – WCAC Player of the Year

References

San Francisco
San Francisco Dons men's basketball seasons
San Francisco
San Francisco Dons
San Francisco Dons